The 14th Street station was an express station on the demolished IRT Ninth Avenue Line in Manhattan, New York City. It had two levels. The lower level was built first and had two tracks and two side platforms. The upper level was built as part of the Dual Contracts and had one track and two side platforms over the lower level local tracks. It closed on June 11, 1940. The next southbound stop was Christopher Street for express and local trains. The next northbound local stop was 23rd Street. The next northbound express stop was 34th Street.

References

IRT Ninth Avenue Line stations
Former elevated and subway stations in Manhattan
Railway stations closed in 1940
1940 disestablishments in New York (state)
14th Street (Manhattan)